Woodfin is a surname. Notable people with the surname include:

Eric Woodfin Naylor (1936–2019), American Hispanist, scholar, and educator
Randall Woodfin (born 1981), American lawyer and politician
Zac Woodfin (born 1983), American football coach and player